Jankūnai is a village in Kėdainiai district municipality, in Kaunas County, in central Lithuania. According to the 2011 census, the village had a population of 6 people. There is a cemetery.

At the beginning of the 20th century Jankūnai village was a property of the Jaugėlos and Liudkevičiai families.

Demography

References

Villages in Kaunas County
Kėdainiai District Municipality